The Southern Command (transliterated: Pikud Darom), often abbreviated to Padam (פד"מ), is a regional command of the Israel Defense Forces (IDF). It is responsible for the Negev, the Arava, and Eilat. It is currently headed by Aluf Eliezer Toledano.

History
For many years the Southern Command was tasked with defending the Negev and securing the border on the Sinai Peninsula from Egypt. The Southern Command led IDF troops in five wars against Egypt: the 1948 Arab–Israeli War, the Suez War, the Six-Day War, the War of Attrition, and the Yom Kippur War. This high operational activity and its demanding toll resulted in the Southern Command's Alufs (SCA) being replaced fairly rapidly. The most famous replacements took place in 1973, during the Yom Kippur War when Shmuel Gonen was suspended as the SCA due to repeated disputes with Ariel Sharon, who was the previous SCA. The government-appointed Chaim Bar-Lev, who was the former Chief of Staff, as the new SCA in an emergency directive. After the Egypt–Israel peace treaty, the southern front remained quiet and most of the activity centred on guarding the borders from smugglers and fluid security over the Gaza Strip.

During the Al-Aqsa Intifada, the Command was placed in charge-of counter-terrorist efforts. The Gaza Strip, one of the most densely populated places in the world, was known as a stronghold for extremist groups such as Hamas and Islamic Jihad, who engaged in Palestinian political violence. The local production and proliferation of light anti-tank weapons by these groups, made travel by lightly armored vehicles dangerous. From 2004, the fighting in Gaza became especially intensive, and on the IDF's part, included targeted killings, short armored expeditions, and efforts to locate and destroy the smuggling tunnels used by Palestinian militant groups to obtain weapons.

During 2005, the Southern Command was involved in the unilateral Gaza disengagement plan, initiated by Ariel Sharon (Prime Minister of Israel, 2001–2006), which mainly entailed the removals of all Israeli settlements from the Gaza Strip and back to the Israeli side of the Green Line. The Command re-situated itself north of the Gaza fence, while the Philadelphi Route was given to Egypt, who did not however prevent the movement of thousands of Palestinians between the Gaza Strip and the Sinai through the city of Rafah. , the attempt to infiltrate Israel to perform suicide bombings and the launch of Qassam rockets, especially by Islamic Jihad and the Popular Resistance Committees, remains ongoing and is the central focus of the Southern Command.

Units

 Southern Command in Beersheba
 80th "Edom" (Territorial) Division
 143rd "Fire Fox" (Territorial) Division (former Gaza Division)
 162nd "Ha-Plada"/"Steel" Armor Division
 252nd "Sinai" (Reserve) Armor Division
 5005th "Southern Command" Logistic Support Unit (South West)
 5006th "Southern Command" Logistic Support Unit (South East)
 Southern Command Signal Battalion
 Southern Command Engineering Unit
 Southern Command Intelligence Unit
 Southern Command Military Police Unit
 Southern Command Medical Unit
 653rd Maintenance Center

Commanders

References

 
Regional commands of Israel